Lazzarella is a 1957 Italian comedy film directed by Carlo Ludovico Bragaglia and starring Alessandra Panaro and Mario Girotti (later best known as Terence Hill). It is loosely inspired by the lyrics of the song "Lazzarella" by  Riccardo Pazzaglia and Domenico Modugno, with the same Pazzaglia serving as a screenwriter. The film was a box office success, being the tenth most viewed film in the 1957/58 season in Italy.

Plot
Luciano, who studies at the University, falls in love with Sandra, a high school student, who reciprocates his love. If her family is very rich, his is of modest extraction; the difference in conditions does not seem to be a problem, however, and Luciano's degree increases the hope of a happy future. Following a sudden financial crisis, however, Sandra's family business goes bankrupt: so, to come to the aid of her parents, the girl accepts the care of a very rich childhood friend, deciding to marry him to get his financial support. Luciano, not aware of the girl's motives, will leave her in a bad way. But Lazzarella's feelings will prevail and in the end he will find his love again.

Production 
The film is inspired by the song of the same name sung by Aurelio Fierro and winner of the second prize at the Naples Festival in 1957. Written by Domenico Modugno and Riccardo Pazzaglia, the song had already been a huge success and had also been translated into French and performed by Dalida.

Cast 

Alessandra Panaro as Sandra de Luca aka Lazzarella 
Mario Girotti as Luciano Prisco
Rossella Como as  Fanny
Luigi De Filippo as  Baron Nicola Sant'Elmo
Domenico Modugno as Mimì
Irène Tunc as Brigitte Clermont
Tina Pica as Widow Capuana
Dolores Palumbo as Donna Carmela 
Aurelio Fierro as Aurelio
 Madeleine Fischer as  Sandra's mother
Riccardo Garrone as Sandra's father
Turi Pandolfini as Professor Avallone
 Mario Ambrosino as  Scognamiglio
 Roy Ciccolini as  Fernando

References

External links
 

Italian comedy films
1957 comedy films
1957 films
Films directed by Carlo Ludovico Bragaglia
Films scored by Carlo Rustichelli
Titanus films
Italian black-and-white films
1950s Italian films